Saint Nazarius was the fourteenth abbot of the monastery of Lérins, probably during the reign of the Merovingian Clotaire II (584-629). He successfully attacked the remnants of paganism on the southern coast of France, overthrew a sanctuary of Venus near Cannes, and founded on its site a convent for women, which was destroyed by the Saracens in the 8th century. His name is inscribed on the calendar of saints of the French Church, on 18 November.

References

7th-century Frankish saints
French Roman Catholic saints